Firestarr 2 is a fourth studio album by American hardcore rapper Fredro Starr, released on March 9, 2018 by Mad Money Movement. The album was released only on digital platforms.

The album was produced by American producers The Elite Producers, The Korruption and Paul Cabbin. The album features appearances by American rappers Vado, The Kid Daytona, Begetz, Ali Vegas, River, vocalist of the American rock band XO Stereo, Cooper Campbell, and French DJ Nelson.

Background 
In 2011, Fredro Starr announced via Twitter that he was working on the follow-up of his debut work. The album was due out in the summer of 2012, but later the release was postponed to the first half of 2013. In the end, the project was abandoned, as Fredro met producer The Audible Doctor. A few tracks recorded for the album "Firestarr 2" was featured on the mixtape "Live 4Ever, Die 2Day" (2013)

Singles 
The one and only single, "Do U Know" featuring Vado and The Kid Daytona was released, February 26, 2018. The single "What If 2" that was released in 2013 and was marked as the first single from the upcoming album "Firestarr 2" never got to this album.

Videos 
In November 2017, was filmed a short film "Firestarr 2" by Slovak film director Michal Nemtuda, by the script of Fredro Starr. The film shows one day from the life of Firestarr. The soundtrack to this movie is the studio album "Firestarr 2" by Fredro Starr. The music video "South America" was filmed in the beautiful city of Medellin, Colombia November 7, 2016 and was released on April 26, 2018. The music video for "Private Jet To Heaven" was released in 2012.

Track listing

Leftover tracks 
Songs that were recorded in 2012 during the "Firestarr 2" sessions but cut from the final album:
 "King Of My City" [Produced by The Elite Producers]
 "All Or Nothing" (feat. Begetz) [Produced by The Korruption]
 "Summer New York 95" [Produced by Goldhands]
 "Made In The Streets" [Produced by Rick Griffin]
 "Triple Flyness" [Produced by Agallah]
 "The Ups And Downs" (feat. T.J. Gibson) [Produced by Agallah]
 "100 Dollar High" (feat. Begetz) [Produced by Agallah]
 "180 On The Dash" [Produced by Emaqulent]

Personnel 
Credits for Firestarr 2 adapted from back cover of release.

 Fredro Starr — performer, vocals, executive producer
 Omar "Iceman" Sharif — executive producer
 Sam Madill — recording, mixing, mastering
 Vado — guest artist
 The Kid Daytona — guest artist
 Begetz — guest artist
 Ali Vegas — guest artist
 River — guest artist
 Cooper Campbell — guest artist
 DJ Nelson — guest artist, scratches
 The Elite Producers — producer
 The Korruption — producer
 Paul Cabbin — producer
 Woah! Graphics — design

References

External links 
 Firestarr 2 at Discogs
 
 
 

Fredro Starr albums
2018 albums